Butterfly Kisses (Shades of Grace) is the third studio album by American Christian music artist Bob Carlisle. It was released by Diadem/Jive Records on May 13, 1997. The album peaked at No. 1 on the Billboard 200.

Track listing

Personnel
 Bob Carlisle – vocals, guitars, mandolin
 Glenn Pearce – electric and acoustic guitars
 Dennis Patton – keyboards, piano, organ
 Scott Sheriff – keyboards, piano, organ
 Mark Hill – bass
 Regie Hamm – keyboards, drums, percussion
 Bryan Duncan – additional vocals on track 11
 Leslie Glassford – backing vocals
 Linda Elias – backing vocals
 Rebecca Palmer – backing vocals

Production
 Larry Day – executive producer
 Bob Carlisle – arranger, producer
 Dennis Patton – arranger
 Regie Hamm – arranger
 Scott Sheriff – arranger
 David Jahnsen – recording, mixing
 High-Pass Productions – recording location
 Gambit Studios – mixing location
 Denny Purcell – mastering at Georgetown Masters

Charts

Weekly charts

Year-end charts

Certifications/sales

References

1997 albums
Bob Carlisle albums
Jive Records albums